Achhod is a village panchayat located in the Bharuch district of Gujarat state, India. It has a population of around 15,000.

Gandhinagar is the state capital for Achhod village, and is located around 150km away.

References

Villages in Bharuch district